The rental vacancy rate is an economic indicator which measures the percentage of rental homes that are vacant.

Residential vacancies
In the United States the Census Bureau keeps track  of vacancy rates.
In Canada Canada Mortgage and Housing Corporation measures vacancy rates of 25 metropolitan areas and for the 75 largest Metropolitan Statistical Areas (MSAs) across the country  and publishes the findings semi-annually in June and December.

Commercial vacancies
According to the Seattle Times office space is "tight" in Seattle and  Bellevue.

References

Economic indicators
Housing